Albert Costa was the defending champion and successfully defended his title, by defeating Fernando Vicente 7–5, 6–2, 6–7(5–7), 7–6(7–4) in the final.

Seeds
All seeds received a bye to the second round.

Draw

Finals

Top half

Section 1

Section 2

Bottom half

Section 3

Section 4

References

External links
 Official results archive (ATP)
 Official results archive (ITF)

Singles
Austrian Open Kitzbühel